This is a list of television serial dramas released by TVB in 2014.

Top ten drama series in ratings
The following is a list of the highest-rated drama series released by TVB in 2014. The list includes premiere week, final week ratings, series finale ratings, as well as the average overall count of live Hong Kong viewers (in millions). The top five include overall ratings across all platforms.

Notes
 A  According to Nielsen ratings, Gilded Chopstick was the year's most-watched live television programme with an average of 29 points. However, Line Walker topped Gilded Chopsticks in ratings across all platforms, averaging 30.5 points.

Awards

First line-up
These dramas air in Hong Kong from 8:00pm to 8:30pm, Monday to Friday on Jade.

Second line-up
These dramas air in Hong Kong from 8:30pm to 9:30pm, Monday to Friday on Jade.

Third line-up
These dramas air in Hong Kong from 9:30pm to 10:30pm, Monday to Friday on Jade.

Weekend dramas
These dramas air in Hong Kong every Saturday or Sunday night from 8.00pm to 9.00pm on Jade.

References

External links
TVB.com Official Website 

2014
2014 in Hong Kong television
2014 in Chinese television